Who's Missing is a compilation of rare and previously unreleased songs by The Who. Its second part Two's Missing was released on 11 April 1987.

The CD was reissued in Japan on 24 December 2011 with additional bonus tracks drawn from the Japanese only bonus disc for Then and Now, as a 2-CD set together with Two's Missing. The album was remastered by Jon Astley from the original analog master tapes.

Critical reception

Reviewing for AllMusic critic Richie Unterberger wrote of the album: "Some of these [songs] are really good: the raucous 1965 cover of James Brown's 'Shout and Shimmy,' 'Heaven and Hell' (one of John Entwistle's better tunes), the 45 version of 'Mary Anne with the Shaky Hand,' the obscure Roger Daltrey tune 'Here for More.' Other cuts are pretty peripheral, like the '65 R&B version of 'Lubie (Come Back Home),' or the live version of 'Bargain.'"

Track listing

Artwork
The album cover design is by Richard Evans and is an acknowledgement of Peter Blake's Got a Girl (1960–61).

References

External links
 Liner notes by Pete Townshend

The Who compilation albums
B-side compilation albums
1985 compilation albums
MCA Records compilation albums